Andreas Bauer (born 21 January 1964) is a West German/German former ski jumper.

Career
Competing in two Winter Olympics, he finished sixth in the team large hill in 1988 and seventh in the individual large hill in 1984.

Bauer's best finish at the FIS Nordic World Ski Championships was 18th in the individual normal hill at Lahti in 1989. He also finished 21st in the FIS Ski-Flying World Championships 1990 at Vikersund. Bauer's lone career World Cup victory was at an individual normal hill event in West Germany in 1987.

Since 2005 he has worked as a ski jumping coach for the German national team in Nordic combined skiing.

World Cup

Standings

Wins

External links

Ski jumpers at the 1984 Winter Olympics
Ski jumpers at the 1988 Winter Olympics
German male ski jumpers
Olympic ski jumpers of West Germany
Living people
1964 births
German ski jumping coaches
People from Oberstdorf
Sportspeople from Swabia (Bavaria)